Mount Holly (also Mount Helley, Mount Holley, Pences Mills) is an unincorporated community in Warren County, in the U.S. state of Ohio.

History
A sawmill and gristmill were built at Mount Holly as early as the 1810s. Mount Holly was platted in 1833, and named after Mount Holly, New Jersey. A post office called Mount Holly was established in 1843, and remained in operation until 1863.

References

Unincorporated communities in Warren County, Ohio
Unincorporated communities in Ohio